Doris (Ris) Lacoste is a chef in Washington D.C.

Lacoste studied at Anne Willan's  La Varenne Ecole de Cuisine in Paris. On her return to her native New England, she joined Chef Bob Kinkead at the Harvest Restaurant in Cambridge, MA - Harvard Square. After that, Lacoste assisted Kinkead with opening 21 Federal in Nantucket and later in downtown Washington, D.C. In 1992, they were named Restaurateurs of the Year by Washingtonian magazine. After 21 Federal closed in 1993, Lacoste and Kinkead opened Kinkead's - An American Brasserie, which was a D.C. dining institution over two decades.

In 1995, Lacoste left Kinkead's to become Executive Chef for Clyde's Restaurant Group's 1789 in Georgetown. During her time as Executive Chef, she earned the title of Chef of the Year and 1789 received the honor of Restaurant of the Year at The Capital Restaurant & Hospitality Awards. 1789 was  recognized as one of the nation's finest restaurants under Lacoste. Her innovative, regional American cuisine earned her awards from The Washington Post and Wine Spectator magazine, and she was a finalist for a James Beard Award in 1999. In 2002, a dinner she created in celebration of Julia Child's 90th birthday was filmed and became a top-rated documentary on Washington's public television outlet, WETA in the summer of 2004.

Lacoste left 1789 at the end of 2005 and opened Ris in December 2009, in the West End neighborhood of Washington, located in the Ritz-Carlton. A Washington Post reviewer noted that Lacoste promised a neighborhood restaurant that would be both rustic and elegant, and continues to make good on her word.

Lacoste is also very active in the community, participating in annual fundraising efforts for the Ovarian Cancer National Alliance, St. Jude Children's Research Hospital, and D.C. Central Kitchen, to name a few. She sits on the board of the Restaurant Association of Metropolitan Washington and is a trustee for the non-profit organization Hospitality High School of Washington D.C.

References

External links 
Ris Lacoste's Website
RIS DC

Year of birth missing (living people)
Living people
University of Rochester alumni
University of California, Berkeley alumni
American chefs
Place of birth missing (living people)